Igor Vasilevich Buldakov (26 August 1930 – 30 April 1979) was a Russian rower who competed for the Soviet Union in the 1956 Summer Olympics.

In 1956 he and his partner Viktor Ivanov won the silver medal in the coxless pairs event.

References

External links
 

1930 births
1979 deaths
Russian male rowers
Soviet male rowers
Olympic rowers of the Soviet Union
Rowers at the 1956 Summer Olympics
Olympic silver medalists for the Soviet Union
Olympic medalists in rowing
Medalists at the 1956 Summer Olympics
European Rowing Championships medalists